The Los Angeles Review, LAR,  is an annual print and online literary journal. It was established in 2003.

Dr. Kate Gale, managing editor of Red Hen Press, is its editor.
Reportedly, each issue is dedicated to a West coast writer. 

It has been presenting awards for writers. In 2016, the Los Angeles Review has introduced awards for: Short Fiction; Flash Fiction; Creative Nonfiction and Poetry. In it ran 'Poetry Event' that year.

References

External links 

Literary magazines published in the United States
Publications established in 2003